Serodyanjiv Gankhuyag (born 6 September 1994) is a Mongolian footballer who plays as a midfielder for Mongolian Premier League club Khangarid and the Mongolian national team.

Club career
Gankhuyag has played for the Khangarid FC since 2013.

International career
Gankhuyag made his senior international debut on 3 November 2016 in a 2016 AFC Solidarity Cup match against Macau. He also competed with the under-23 team at the 2017 Aceh World Solidarity Tsunami Cup.

International goals
Score and result list Mongolia's goal tally first.

International career statistics

References

External links
Mongolian Football Federation profile
Soccerway profile
National Football Teams profile

1994 births
Living people
Mongolian footballers
Association football midfielders
Mongolia international footballers
Mongolian National Premier League players